The Pridvorica massacre was the mass killing of 180 Serb civilians by Muslim members of the Croatian fascist Ustaše movement on 7 January 1942, during World War II.

Background

On 6 April 1941, Yugoslavia was invaded by the Axis powers. The ensuing capitulation resulted in its territory being divided between Germany and its allies. Adolf Hitler set up the Independent State of Croatia (NDH), a puppet-state which covered present-day Croatia (excluding Dalmatia), all of present-day Bosnia and Herzegovina and parts of present-day Serbia. The Croatian fascist ultranationalist Ustaše movement were appointed to rule the new state with Ante Pavelić installed as the leader. The Ustaše then embarked on a campaign of genocide against the Serb, Jewish and Roma population within their borders. Muslims were not persecuted due to the belief that they were descendants of Croats who had converted to Islam. A great deal of the Muslim population sided with the Ustaše while others joined the Communist Partisans.

According to the 1931 census, the municipality of Gacko (of which Pridvorica is part) had a population of 15,233 of whom 5,724 were Muslims. Taking into account the nearby municipality of Nevesinje, the two regions' Serb population constituted 67%, Muslim 28% and Croat nearly 4%.

With the signing of the Treaties of Rome between Fascist Italy and the NDH, Ustaša units began their administrative takeover following Italy's withdrawal from zone III. Local upper-class Muslims were put in charge of Gacko. A group of Ustašas led by Herman "Krešo" Togonal arrived and began organizing a local command in Gacko. They attempted to win over the support of the Muslims by promising them among other things, the return of landholdings they lost during the agrarian reforms of the 1920s and the building of mosques in villages.

Historian Tomislav Dulić notes that Ustaše success in carrying out massacres often depended on them securing the support and trust of local Croats and Muslims, and that "Where such pacification succeeded, they were more or less free to initiate the destruction process." Togonal held a meeting with local Muslims where he presented a historical exposition and outlined the Ustaše's ideological views on the Muslim population. He finished the meeting by arguing that all Serbs had to be killed: "We cannot be satisfied and will not stop until the total extermination of the last Serb from our Independent State of Croatia. The last bullet for the last Serb."

Massacre
In order to implement the decisions of the Resolution of Mostar Muslims, the Ustaše, together with Muslims from neighboring villages, killed the entire Serb population of Pridvorica which numbered about 180 locals including women, children and the elderly. The killings were carried out with firearms and knives with most of the inhabitants killed by being locked up in barns and set on fire. The massacre occurred on 7 January 1942 which is the day Serbian Orthodox Christians celebrate Christmas.

The remains were buried in two graves next to the local Holy Prince Lazar Serbian Orthodox church on 17 April 1942, and they were not transferred to the church's crypt until 29 November 2006.

As a child, Blagoje Adžić witnessed the slaughter of his family in the massacre while hiding in a tree.

Notes

Sources
 
 
 
 
 
 
 
 
 

Massacres in the Independent State of Croatia
1942 in Croatia
Massacres in 1942
History of the Serbs of Croatia
History of the Serbs of Bosnia and Herzegovina
Mass murder in 1942
Massacres of Serbs
Persecution by Muslims